Claws Mail is a free and open-source, C/GTK-based e-mail client, which is both lightweight and highly configurable. Claws Mail runs on both Windows and Unix-like systems such as Linux, BSD, and Solaris. It stores mail in the MH mailbox format. Plugins allow to read HTML mail, but there is none to compose HTML messages.

Features 
Claws Mail is also a News client and RSS aggregator. Further features – integrated or supplied via plugins – include:

Search and filtering, optionally via Perl and Python scripting
Security (GPG, SSL, anti-phishing)
Anti-spam (SpamAssassin, Bogofilter)
Per-folder preferences
Optional external editor
Templates for messages
Themes support, customisable toolbars, X-Face support, foldable quotes
Viewers for HTML mail (Dillo, Gtkhtml2, Fancy (WebKit), LiteHTML)
TNEF attachment parser
PDF viewer
Various notification plugins, e. g. trayicon and LED handler
Archiving, import/export from standard formats
Support for Mbox mailbox format
Calendaring with events as kind of messages

History 
Development started in April 2001 as Sylpheed-Claws off the development version of Sylpheed, where new features could be tested and debugged. In August 2005 Claws Mail forked completely from Sylpheed.

See also 

Sylpheed
List of Usenet newsreaders
Comparison of Usenet newsreaders
Comparison of email clients
Comparison of feed aggregators

References

External links

Email client software for Linux
Email clients that use GTK
Free email software
Free software programmed in C
Free Usenet clients
GNOME Applications